Woodsholea is a genus of bacteria from the family of Maricaulaceae with one known species (Woodsholea maritima).

References

Bacteria genera
Monotypic bacteria genera